Eadnoth II (or Eadnothus II) was a medieval Bishop of Dorchester, when the town was seat of the united dioceses of Lindsey and Dorchester.

Eadnoth was consecrated in 1034 and died on 18 or 19 September 1049.

Citations

References

External links
 

Bishops of Dorchester (Mercia)
1049 deaths
Year of birth unknown